Hendrik Jacobus Marx (14 November 1989 – 15 July 2010) was a Namibian cricketer. He was a right-handed batsman and a right-arm medium-fast bowler who played for the Namibian Under-19s cricket team since 2006, when he played in the Under-19s World Cup.

Marx was part of the Namibian Under-19 team which won the Under-19 African Championship in 2007.

Marx made his first-class debut in February 2009 against Border.

On 15 July 2010, Marx died in a car accident in Stellenbosch, South Africa.

References

External links

1989 births
Cricketers from Windhoek
Namibian cricketers
Road incident deaths in South Africa
2010 deaths